Veteli is a municipality of Finland.

It is located in the province of Western Finland and is part of the Central Ostrobothnia region.

Neighbouring municipalities are Evijärvi, Halsua, Kaustinen, Kronoby, Lappajärvi, Perho and Vimpeli.

The municipality is unilingually Finnish.

Politics
Results of the 2011 Finnish parliamentary election in Veteli:

Centre Party   42.1%
True Finns   39.3%
Social Democratic Party   7.8%
Christian Democrats   4.2%
National Coalition Party   3.3%
Left Alliance   1.0%
Swedish People's Party   0.7%
Green League   0.6%

Notable people
Juha Sipilä, (born 1961), politics former Prime Minister of Finland (2015–2019),
Esko Aho, (born 1954), politician, former Prime Minister of Finland (1991–1995)

References

External links

Municipality of Veteli – Official website